José Ferreira (born 7 May 1923) is a Portuguese épée and sabre fencer. He competed at the 1952 and 1960 Summer Olympics.

References

External links
 

1923 births
Possibly living people
Portuguese male épée fencers
Olympic fencers of Portugal
Fencers at the 1952 Summer Olympics
Fencers at the 1960 Summer Olympics
Sportspeople from Lisbon
Portuguese male sabre fencers